The Iranian Students' News Agency (ISNA,) is a news agency run by Iranian university students.

Position
It covers a variety of national and international topics. Editors and correspondents are themselves students in a variety of subjects, many of them are volunteers (nearly 1000). ISNA is considered by Western media to be one of the most independent and moderate media organizations in Iran, and is often quoted. "While taking a reformist view of events, ISNA has managed to remain politically independent. It has, however, maintained its loyalty to the former president and carries a section devoted to "Khatami's perspectives".

Although it is generally considered independent, the ISNA is financially supported in part by the Iranian government and is supported by ACECR (Academic Center for Education, Culture and Research), another student organization. The agency's main founder and first director Abolfazl Fateh, who resigned in late 2005, was taken to the court on several occasions, including for a report on Shirin Ebadi, a Nobel Peace Prize winner and human rights activist. Also, once he was beaten by police while supporting his correspondents to report student demonstration in June 2003. According to the Guardian, reformist daily Aftab-e Yazd 14 June 2003, in its Editorial column wrote: "It is not easy to overlook the injury caused to Dr Abolfazl Fateh, the hardworking managing director of the Iranian Students' News Agency, who had come to the scene to ensure an accurate reporting of events and prevent any news distortion by foreign media... [His] greatest concern was that if the people do not receive the news from us, they would do so from our enemies or at best from our competitors.".

History

Iranian Students' News Agency was established in December 1999 in order to report on news from Iranian universities. 

In January 2005 a server called The Planet unilaterally stopped hosting the website of the ISNA. The ISNA said that they did not receive a reason for the closure, and had only been informed 48 hours before the move. An Iranian government official later accused the United States of ordering the shutdown.  The incident led to new calls for Iran to develop its own satellite communication technology.

After Abolfazl Fateh's resignation in September 2005, Mehdi Nad'alizadeh, ISNA's head of political news was appointed as ISNA's director. He was replaced by Hamid Hasan - Zadeh in 2007. They were the only directors who were appointed from ISNA's editors. However, from 2008 till now, all directors have been appointed from outside the ISNA but most were a member of the ACECR..

Analysis

Abolfazl Fateh in his PhD thesis, defended in 2011 at University of Oxford" entitled "the Power of News Production" stated about ISNA (Iranian Student News Agency),"During this period [1999-2005], ISNA turned into a major source of news, information and content in the Iranian media, attracting the attention of journalists, media experts and academics. Although the reasons for this strong attention may vary among these groups — from ISNA’s political impact to its peculiarities as a news agency — perhaps the common denominator among all of them was that ISNA presented a novelty on the Iranian (and to some degree, global) media scene. In a society that seemingly had experience of major changes initiated by unofficial media, as had happened during the Islamic Revolution (Sreberny-Mohammadi 1990), or by few periodicals and a newspaper with a small circulation together with student activists, as had happened during the reform movement (Khāniki 1998), this news source had and demonstrated the potential to bring about a considerable change in Iran’s media content and its functions. ISNA may not be framed as a news agency or fit a specific model; however, it was a symbol of the media that "reflect and direct at the same time" (Deuze 2009, p. 457).

Meanwhile, the Thesis confirms "ISNA suffered from certain shortcomings having to do with how it operates -- for example, not operating twenty four hours a day; not presenting news according to established professional standards; not having a multilingual website; having educational, editorial and technological weaknesses; focusing on domestic activities and news, and not having vast regional or international branches; and, most importantly, financial dependence on the government. Moreover, despite its honesty, fairness, and accuracy, the agency could not demonstrate itself as an impartial news agency particularly in later years of the period when it pumped out reform idealism and combined news activities with cyber activism. Therefore,... ISNA perhaps cannot be characterized as a member of the media with the highest journalistic values and professional standards. However, under the circumstances that prevailed at the time, it would be safe to say that it provided the best possible and strategic way to set up a relatively reliable but constant information flow in the country during this period".

As indicated in the thesis, "Regardless of any fate that the agency [ISNA] faces in the future..., it is clearly evident that ISNA, in the context of the Iranian media sphere and in comparison with other news sources in the country [during the period in between 1999-2005], rose as a new media phenomenon. This unique student news agency created a range of innovatory and influential journalistic work. All of these characteristics emerged while ISNA was affiliated with a revolutionary organization like ACECR. This affiliation raises the question as to whether ISNA represents a mutation in the revolutionary organizations in the country".

The thesis statement added, "ISNA was a new idea that turned into a reality and added another dimension to the news agency’s mission in the country. The study reminds us of the importance and significance of news agencies in a region where they are not considered important or powerful players. As such, it introduces a workable model that can be potentially replicated in the region".

As Fateh's thesis explained, "ISNA represents a unique type of journalism and a unique form of media organization that combined distinctive elements of local and global characteristics in its inception and operation. It is difficult to frame ISNA as a news agency or claim that the agency “fits a model”. At one level ISNA can probably be seen as a hybrid of participatory and traditional journalism and at another level as a hybrid organization that bridged the gap between competent journalism and cyber activism or cyber politics. In a serious way, ISNA defined its own model of a news agency, while at the same time acting as a social maverick and providing a mould for civic participation. These unique characteristics explain the success and impact of ISNA on the media scene in Iran, providing the key to its early development and survival. As such, in a rather direct way, ISNA embodied the socio-politics of Iran, with its deep heterogeneity and perhaps contradictions. It symbolizes a period of Iranian contemporary history in its rich complexity".

See also
List of Iranian news agencies

References

Further reading

External links

  
  

1999 establishments in Iran
Organizations established in 1999
News agencies based in Iran
Mass media in Iran